Süleyman Çelebi (also Emir Süleyman; d. 17 February 1411) was an Ottoman prince and a co-ruler of the Ottoman Empire for several years during the Ottoman Interregnum. There is a tradition of western origin, according to which Suleiman the Magnificent was "Suleiman II", but that tradition has been based on an erroneous assumption that Süleyman Çelebi was to be recognised as a legitimate sultan.

Background 
Süleyman was the eldest son of Bayezid I. His mother's name is not known. He fought both in the Battle of Nicopolis (1396) against the Crusaders and the Battle of Ankara (1402) against Timur. In the latter, he was in the command of Ottoman left flank. But when the Ottoman army was defeated, he fled to European portion of the empire, also called Rumelia (or Rumeli), with his father's vizier Çandarlı Ali Pasha.

Ottoman Interregnum 

He signed the Treaty of Gallipoli with the Byzantine regent John VII Palaiologos in 1403. (The emperor Manuel II Palaiologos was traveling in West Europe at the time). By this treaty, he gave up The city Thessalonica and certain territories along the Marmara coast to the Byzantine Empire in return for Byzantine support in interregnum. He declared himself as the sultan of the empire in Edirne, the co capital in Rumeli of the Ottoman Empire. But the Asiatic side of the empire, so called Anatolia, was under the control of his two brothers İsa Çelebi and Mehmet Çelebi (future Mehmet I). Süleyman supported İsa against Mehmet. However, Mehmet defeated İsa in several battles in 1406. Afraid of Mehmet's increasing power, Süleyman crossed the Dardanelles strait to reunite the empire. He captured Bursa, the Anatolian capital. But before fighting against Mehmet, he marched to the Aegean Region to intimidate the small Turkmen principalies (beyliks of Aydin and Menteşe) which had been annexed by the brothers' father Beyazid I, but had broken free after the disastrous Battle of Ankara. He then captured the city of Ankara from Mehmet but did not advance further.

Süleyman returned to Bursa, which gave Mehmet a chance to relax. Mehmet then made an alliance with their brother Musa Çelebi, who was also a contender for the Ottoman throne, sending Musa to the European portion of the empire (Rumelia) via Wallachia (modern Romania). Because of this plot, Süleyman now had to fight in two fronts on two sides, one in Europe against Musa and one in Anatolia against Mehmet. Süleyman turned his attention to Rumelia against Musa, leaving Anatolia to Mehmet once again. Musa had the support of Wallachians and the Serbs, and Süleyman had the support of the Byzantines. However, the Serbs switched sides and joined Süleyman's forces, and Musa was defeated in the Battle of Kosmidion on 15 June 1410. However, Süleyman was not a willful prince, and to the dismay of his partisans, he began living in extravagance. Especially after the death of his able vizier Çandarlı Ali Pasha, Süleyman's indifference to state affairs caused him to lose supporters. Thus in 1411, when Musa marched to Edirne, Süleyman found almost no one at his side. He tried to escape to Byzantine territories, but on the way, he was murdered on February 17, 1411.

Aftermath 
After Süleyman's death, Musa became the ruler of the Rumeli. The alliance between Mehmet and Musa soon broke and the two brothers continued to fight until Musa's defeat and death on July 5, 1413, in the Battle of Çamurlu when Mehmet became the sole ruler of the empire as Mehmet I.

Family

Süleyman married two times:
A daughter of Ilario Doria and his wife Zampia Palaiologina, illegitimate daughter of Emperor Manuel II Palaiologos, married in 1403;
A daughter of Theodore I Palaiologos, Despot of Morea and his unnamed mistress, married in 1404;

He had three children;
Şehzade Orhan Çelebi (died 1429);
Şehzade Mehmedşah (died 30 December 1421);
Paşamelek Hatun, married to a Sanjak Bey.

References

Sources
Zachariadou, Elizabeth A. "Süleyman çelebi in Rumili and the Ottoman chronicles." Der Islam 60.2 (1983): 268–296.

Year of birth unknown
1411 deaths
14th-century people from the Ottoman Empire
15th-century people from the Ottoman Empire
Ottoman princes
People of the Ottoman Interregnum
Pretenders to the Ottoman throne